Notes On Desire is the fourth album by Helen Watson, released in 1997. The album was recorded at Cavalier Studios in Stockport and Out of the Blues Studios in Manchester.

Self-financed, the album saw Watson return to her folk roots after the glossy sheen of the EMI and RCA years.

The Helen Watson Band
 Helen Watson - vocals
 Martin McGroarty - guitars
 Bo - bass and vocals
 Snuff - drums and percussion

Guest musicians
 Eryl Roberts - percussion
 Jake Newman - double bass
 Chris Nelson - saxophones
 Dave Baldwin - keyboards
 Luke Smith - keyboards

Track listing 
 "Shiver" (Watson, McGroarty)
 "Isn't That What It's For" (Watson, McGroarty)
 "Since I Fell for You" (Bud Johnson)
 "Time of Your Life" (Watson, McGroarty)
 "Notes On Desire (At Its Height)" (Watson, McGroarty)
 "Blame It On the Sun" (Syreeta Wright, Stevie Wonder)
 "Magnificent" (Watson, McGroarty)
 "From the Top" (Watson, McGroarty)
 "I Told You I Love You - Now Get Out" (Frigo, Ellis, Carter)
 "Conversation" (Watson, McGroarty)
 "Let Me Be the First to Tell You" (Watson, McGroarty)
 "The Last Thing I Need" (Watson, McGroarty)
 "Jackie You're Moody" (Watson, McGroarty, Trundle)
 "I Want More" (Billie Holiday)
 "Fell for It" (Watson, McGroarty)

External links
 Helen Watson website
 J.A.D.'s Helen Watson Webpage

1995 albums
Helen Watson (singer-songwriter) albums